Pery Broad, also Perry Broad (25 April 1921 – 28 November 1993) was a Brazilian-born German non-commissioned officer in the Schutzstaffel (SS) active at Auschwitz concentration camp from April 1942 to 1945. He reached the rank of SS-Unterscharführer while working as a translator and stenographer in the camp headquarters. As a prisoner after the war, he wrote a historically valuable account of the camp's operation, dubbed the Broad Report.

Broad, born in Rio de Janeiro in 1921, came to Berlin with his mother at the age of five. He studied at the Technical University of Berlin and joined the Waffen-SS in 1941 as a foreigner. Detached on duty to Auschwitz, he requested a transfer to the Politische Abteilung, where he conducted interrogations. According to Simon Laks, head of the prisoner's orchestra, Broad was a music lover who attended most of its performances, an exception being while choosing female prisoners for the camp brothel.

He remained in Auschwitz until the dissolution of the camp in early 1945 and was captured by British armed forces. While a prisoner of war, he voluntarily wrote a report about his experiences in Auschwitz.

Released in 1947, he again was arrested 12 years later, freed in December 1960 after the payment of DM 50,000 as surety and again arrested in November 1964 as a defendant in the Frankfurt Auschwitz Trials. He was found guilty of supervising selections at Birkenau, as well as of participating in interrogations, tortures and executions, and was sentenced to four years in prison in 1965. In 1979 in Wuppertal, Broad was among those interviewed and secretly filmed by Claude Lanzmann for Shoah, his Holocaust documentary released in 1985.

Published English translations of the Broad Report
 
 republished in 
 reprinted in the United States by Howard Fertig,

References

1921 births
1993 deaths
Auschwitz concentration camp personnel
SS non-commissioned officers
Gestapo personnel
Romani genocide perpetrators
Waffen-SS personnel
20th-century translators
German prisoners of war in World War II held by the United Kingdom
People convicted in the Nazi concentration camp trials
Prisoners and detainees of Germany
Brazilian emigrants to Germany
People convicted in the Frankfurt Auschwitz trials